Aron Burton (June 15, 1938 – February 29, 2016) was an American electric and Chicago blues singer, bass guitarist and songwriter. In a long career as a sideman he played with Freddie King, Albert Collins and Junior Wells and released a number of solo albums, including Good Blues to You (Delmark Records, 1999). His recorded work was nominated four times for a Blues Music Award in the category Blues Instrumentalist—Bass.

Biography
Burton was born in Senatobia, Mississippi. He sang in several local churches and with his cousin founded a singing group, the Victory Travelers. Burton relocated to Chicago, Illinois, in 1955. His musical career commenced the following year, when he played the bass accompanying Freddie King. King purchased Burton's first bass guitar.

Burton served in the United States Army between 1961 and 1965. Upon discharge he found employment playing with Baby Huey & the Babysitters, Junior Wells (with whom Burton toured between 1969 and 1972) and Fenton Robinson. He contributed to recording sessions with George "Wild Child" Butler, Jackie Ross, Andrew "Blueblood" McMahon and Carey Bell (Heartaches and Pain, 1977).  He also recorded a solo single, "Garbage Man", released by Cleartone Records.

In 1978, Burton joined his brother, Larry, in Albert Collins's backing band, the Icebreakers, and performed on Collins's Grammy Award–nominated album Ice Pickin'. He also toured with Collins before leaving his ensemble in the early 1980s. In the meantime, he worked as a horticulturist for twenty years in Garfield Park Conservatory, under the auspices of the Chicago Park District. He found further work playing with James Cotton, Johnny Littlejohn and Fenton Robinson (again), before relocating to Europe for a time in the late 1980s. While there, Burton recorded Usual Dangerous Guy, with piano accompaniment by Champion Jack Dupree.

By the early 1990s, Burton had returned to Chicago. Earwig Records issued the compilation album Past, Present, & Future (1993), a collection of recordings made between 1986 and 1993, in Europe and the United States, which established him as a frontman rather than a supporting musician. He appeared at the Chicago Blues Festival in 1994, where he was joined on stage by Liz Mandeville. She also sang on a couple of tracks of Burton's live album, Aron Burton Live (1996), recorded at Buddy Guy's club, Legends. The following year, Burton and his brother played at the Chicago Blues Festival. This led to the album Good Blues to You, released by Delmark Records in 1999.

Burton co-wrote a song recorded by Too Slim and the Taildraggers on the 2000 album King Size Troublemakers.

Aron Burton died in Chicago on February 29, 2016, of heart disease and diabetes.

Discography

Albums

Selected work with other musicians
Lickin' Gravy, George "Wild Child" Butler, 1976
Heartaches and Pain, Carey Bell (Delmark, 1977 [1994])
Ice Pickin', Albert Collins, 1978
High Compression, James Cotton, 1984
Nightflight, Fenton Robinson, 1984
Million Dollar , Valerie Wellington, 1984
Daddy, When Is Mama Comin' Home, Big Jack Johnson, 1991
Delta Bluesman, David "Honeyboy" Edwards, 1992
Boogie My Blues Away, Eddy Clearwater, 1995
Chicago Blues Session!, Willie Mabon, 1995
Dream, John Littlejohn, 1995
You're Gonna Miss Me, Ann Sexton, 1995
Look at Me, Liz Mandeville, 1996
Live in Chicago, Big Jack Johnson, 1997
Cool Blue, Christian Rannenberg, 2000
Way Things Go, Cleveland Fats, 2006

See also
List of Chicago blues musicians
List of electric blues musicians

References

1938 births
2016 deaths
African-American guitarists
American blues guitarists
American male bass guitarists
American blues singers
Songwriters from Mississippi
Blues musicians from Mississippi
Electric blues musicians
Chicago blues musicians
People from Senatobia, Mississippi
Songwriters from Illinois
Guitarists from Illinois
Guitarists from Mississippi
Deaths from diabetes
20th-century American bass guitarists
20th-century American male musicians
Earwig Music artists
African-American songwriters
20th-century African-American musicians
21st-century African-American people
American male songwriters